Bosko's Fox Hunt is a 1931 one-reel short subject featuring Bosko as part of the Looney Tunes series. It was released on December 12, 1931 and is directed by Hugh Harman. The film score was composed by Frank Marsales.	

The cartoon's plot is somewhat similar to that of the later Looney Tunes cartoons Porky's Duck Hunt and Porky's Hare Hunt.

Plot
A gang of men (male animals in this cartoon) set out on a fox hunt equipped with guns, horses and hounds; however, a fox evades them. The fox is discovered by Bosko and his dog, Bruno, who are out hunting foxes as well. The fox successfully evades Bosko and Bruno's attempts to catch or shoot him. Eventually, the two hunters are chased by a large mammoth-like creature and fall in a heap on the ground, ending the film.

References

External links
 
 

1931 films
1931 animated films
Films scored by Frank Marsales
Films directed by Hugh Harman
Bosko films
Films about hunters
Looney Tunes shorts
Warner Bros. Cartoons animated short films
1930s Warner Bros. animated short films